Monoao refers to the following plants of New Zealand:

Dracophyllum subulatum
Halocarpus kirkii, a native tree of New Zealand resembling a kauri
Manoao colensoi, a native conifer of New Zealand, also called silver pine 

Trees of New Zealand